Elín Edda Sigurðardóttir (born 17 August 1989) is an Icelandic long-distance runner. She competed in the women's half marathon at the 2018 IAAF World Half Marathon Championships held in Valencia, Spain.

In 2019, she finished in 5th place in the women's 10,000 metres at the Games of the Small States of Europe held in Budva, Montenegro. In 2020, she competed in the women's half marathon at the World Athletics Half Marathon Championships held in Gdynia, Poland.

References

External links 
 

Living people
1989 births
Place of birth missing (living people)
Icelandic female middle-distance runners
Icelandic female long-distance runners
Icelandic female marathon runners
20th-century Icelandic women
21st-century Icelandic women